St. Paul's School for Girls may refer to:

St Paul's School for Girls, Birmingham, in Edgbaston, Birmingham, England
St. Paul's School for Girls (Maryland), in Brooklandville, Maryland, U.S.
St Paul's Girls' School, in Brook Green, Hammersmith, West London, England

See also
St Paul's School (disambiguation)